Nightmerica is the only studio album released by American punk band Love Equals Death. It was released in 2006 on Fat Wreck Chords.

Track list

Personnel
Love Equals Death
 Chon Travis - lead vocals
 Duffs - guitar, backing vocals
 Dominic Davi - bass guitar, backing vocals
 Tonio Garcia-Romero - drums, percussion

References

2006 albums
Fat Wreck Chords albums